The Byron Kennedy Award is an award presented by the Australian Academy of Cinema and Television Arts (AACTA), a non-profit organisation whose aim is "to identify, award, promote and celebrate Australia's greatest achievements in film and television." The award is presented at the annual AACTA Awards Ceremony, which hand out accolades for technical achievements in feature film, television, documentaries and short films. From 1984-2010, the award was handed out by the Australian Film Institute (AFI), the Academy's parent organisation, at the annual Australian Film Institute Awards (known as the AFI Awards). When the AFI launched the Academy in 2011, it changed the annual ceremony to the AACTA Awards, with the current award being a continuum of the AFI Byron Kennedy Award.

Named after Byron Kennedy (18 August 1949 – 17 July 1983), an Australian film producer, it recognises a person in their early career for "outstanding creative enterprise within the film and television industries... whose work embodies the qualities of Byron Kennedy: innovation, vision and the relentless pursuit of excellence." Recommendations for recipients are made by the general public, but the AFI and Academy may also select further candidates without the need for an entry. The award includes a A$10,000 cash prize.

Recipients

References

External links
The Official Australian Academy of Cinema and Television Arts website

AACTA Awards
Australian film awards